Eastbrook could refer to the following:

Eastbrook, Dagenham, a public house in London
Eastbrook, Maine, a town in Hancock County, Maine, USA
Eastbrook, Pennsylvania, an unincorporated community in Lawrence County, Pennsylvania, USA
Eastbrook High School, a public high school in Marion, Indiana, USA
Eastbrook railway station, Dinas Powys, Wales
Eastbrook School, a secondary school in London